One by One (reissued in edited form as The Quick and the Dead in 1978) is a documentary about the deadliness of Grand Prix racing, including footage of fatal racing accidents. It is narrated by Stacy Keach.

The film was reissued as The Quick and the Dead in 1978 including the death of Tom Pryce at the 1977 South African Grand Prix. and was later released also as Champions Forever: The Formula One Drivers.

References

External links

1975 films
1978 films
American auto racing films
Documentary films about auto racing
American road movies
1970s road movies
1970s sports films
1970s English-language films
1970s American films